Lagoa Parish may refer to:
Lagoa Parish, Lagoa, Algarve
Lagoa Parish, Macedo de Cavaleiros in Macedo de Cavaleiros
Lagoa Parish, Vila Nova de Famalicão, in Vila Nova de Famalicão